Alireza Jafari is an Iranian comedian and actor born on 25 April 1994 in Tehran, Iran.

Biography
He started his career at the age of five and became known with the film Mum's Guest directed by Dariush Mehrjui. After that, he starred in many movies and series. His uncle, Amir Jafari, is a prominent Iranian actor and he has collaborated with many artists such as Golab Adineh, Elnaz Shakerdoost, Danial Hajibarat, Reza Attaran, Tannaz Tabatabaei and Tarlan Parvaneh.

Filmography excerpt
 Siavash (TV series) directed by Soroush Mohammadzadeh
 Angel Street Bride directed by Mehdi Khosravi
 King of Ear (TV series) directed by Davood Mir Bagheri
 Ferris wheel (TV series) directed by Aziz Allah Hamidnejad
 Hasht Behesht (TV series) directed by Saeed Alemzadeh
 Good to Be Back directed by Dariush Mehrjui
 The Accused Escaped (TV series) directed by Reza Attaran
 Acacia Alley (TV series) directed by Reza Attaran
 Mum's Guest directed by Dariush Mehrjui

References

External links

Alireza Jafari at Namava

1994 births
Living people
Iranian male actors
Iranian male film actors
Iranian male television actors